Zion Lutheran Church is located in rural Norman County, Minnesota, United States. The church was founded in 1880 to serve a Norwegian immigrant congregation. The Victorian Gothic church was constructed during 1883. The church  and adjacent cemetery were listed on the National Register of Historic Places in 1999.

References

External links

19th-century Lutheran churches in the United States
Buildings and structures in Norman County, Minnesota
Churches completed in 1883
Churches on the National Register of Historic Places in Minnesota
Lutheran churches in Minnesota
National Register of Historic Places in Norman County, Minnesota
Norwegian-American culture in Minnesota